Amiga is the name of a series of personal computers.

Amiga is the Portuguese, Spanish, Occitan and Catalan word for "friend" in the feminine, or "female friend".

The word may also refer to:

Businesses and products
 Amiga Corporation, the company that originally developed the Amiga personal computer
 AmigaOS, the operating system of the Amiga personal computer
 Commodore-Amiga, Inc., a subsidiary of Commodore International (both now defunct) that developed and marketed the Amiga personal computer
 Amiga Technologies GmbH, a subsidiary of Escom (both now defunct) that was set up following their purchase of Commodore International in 1996
 Amiga, Inc. (South Dakota), the original 1997 Gateway subsidiary named Amiga, Inc. (incorporated in the US state of South Dakota)
 Amiga, Inc., the company incorporated in the US state of Delaware
 Amiga 1000, the first Amiga computer, originally known simply as the Amiga
 Amiga (record label), a record label that originated in East Germany

People
 Coral Amiga, English actress

Other uses
 Amiga (butterfly), a butterfly in the family Nymphalidae
 Amiga (album)

See also
 Amigo (disambiguation)
 Amica (disambiguation)
 Amicus (disambiguation)